Club Hebraica (or Hebraica) is a Brazilian-Jewish social and recreational community center. The clubs operate in a number of cities in Brazil and are deemed by its members to be important to the expression of Jewish identity. Though Hebraica clubs are found in different cities under the same name, they are operated independently. The World Jewish Congress describes the Hebraica clubs as "exclusive social clubs that are privately owned and traditionally headed by leaders of the community."

Programs
A number of programs are geared to community members who cannot afford Hebraica membership, such as food and transportation for the elderly. The clubs have youth movements and offer informal Jewish education, as well as synagogues.

Locations
 Clube Hebraica São Paulo
 Clube Hebraica Rio
 Hebraica Niteroi
 Hebraica Porto Alegre

See also
 History of the Jews in Brazil

References

Jews and Judaism in Brazil